The 1992 Irish Masters was the eighteenth edition of the professional invitational snooker tournament. It took place from 31 March to 5 April 1992 at Goffs in Kill, County Kildare, and featured twelve professional players.

Stephen Hendry won the title for the first time, beating Ken Doherty 9–6 in the final.

In the ninth and final frame of the quarter-final match between Doherty and Steve Davis, Davis became the first victim of the 'Three misses and out' rule when failing to hit a red on three attempts while being able to see at least one red at full ball, thus losing the final frame to give Doherty a 5–4 win.

Main draw

References

Irish Masters
Irish Masters
Irish Masters
Irish Masters
Irish Masters